The 1979 Nice International Open was a men's tennis tournament played on outdoor clay courts at the Nice Lawn Tennis Club in Nice, France, and was part of the 1979 Colgate-Palmolive Grand Prix. It was the eighth edition of the tournament and was held from 2 April until 8 April 1979. Fifth-seeded Víctor Pecci won the title.

Finals

Singles
 Víctor Pecci defeated  John Alexander 6–3, 6–2, 7–5
 It was Pecci's 1st singles title of the year and the 4th of his career.

Doubles
 Peter McNamara /  Paul McNamee defeated  Pavel Složil /  Tomáš Šmíd 6–1, 3–6, 6–2

References

External links
 ITF tournament edition details

Nice Open
1979
Nice International Open
Nice International Open
20th century in Nice